Selve Marcone was a comune (municipality) in the Province of Biella in the Italian region Piedmont, located about  northeast of Turin and about  northwest of Biella. From 1 January 2017 Selve Marcone was absorbed by the neighbouring municipality of Pettinengo.

As an autonomous commune Selve Marcone bordered the following municipalities: Andorno Micca, Callabiana, Pettinengo, Piedicavallo, Rassa, Tavigliano.

Demographic evolution

References

Former municipalities of the Province of Biella
Frazioni of the Province of Biella